The 2018 Women's World Team Squash Championships was the women's edition of the 2018 World Team Squash Championships, which serves as the world team championship for squash players. The event held in Dalian, China took place from 11 to 19 September 2018. The tournament was organized by the World Squash Federation and the Chinese Squash Association. The Egypt team won its fourth World Team Championships, beating the England team in the final.

Participating teams
16 teams competed in these world championships from all of the five confederations: Africa, America, Asia, Europe and Oceania.

Seeds

Squads

  Egypt
 Nour El Sherbini
 Nour El Tayeb
 Nouran Gohar
 Raneem El Weleily

  Canada
 Danielle Letourneau
 Hollie Naughton
 Nikki Todd
 Samantha Cornett

  Australia
 Alex Haydon
 Christine Nunn
 Donna Lobban
 Sarah Cardwell

  Germany
 Annika Wiese
 Franziska Hennes
 Nele Hatschek
 Saskia Beinhard

  England
 Laura Massaro
 Alison Waters
 Sarah-Jane Perry
 Victoria Lust

  New Zealand
 Abbie Palmer
 Amanda Landers-Murphy
 Joelle King
 Kaitlyn Watts

  Japan
 Ayumi Watanabe
 Misaki Kobayashi
 Risa Sugimoto
 Satomi Watanabe

  Finland
 Emilia Korhonen
 Emilia Soini
 Riina Koskinen

  United States
 Amanda Sobhy
 Olivia Blatchford
 Reeham Sedky
 Sabrina Sobhy

  France
 Camille Serme
 Coline Aumard
 Énora Villard
 Mélissa Alves

  India
 Aparajitha Balamurukan
 Dimple Mathivanan
 Sunayna Kuruvilla
 Tanvi Khanna

  China
 Dou Ying
 He Xinru
 Li Dong Jin
 Peng Zhenni

  Malaysia
 Aifa Azman
 Low Wee Wern
 Nicol David
 Sivasangari Subramaniam

  Hong Kong
 Annie Au
 Ho Tze-Lok
 Joey Chan
 Lee Ka Yi

  South Africa
 Alexandra Fuller
 Elani Landman
 Lizelle Muller
 Milnay Louw

  Switzerland
 Céline Walser
 Cindy Merlo
 Gaby Hubber
 Nadia Pfister

Group stage

Pool A 
11 September

12 September

13 September

Pool B 
11 September

12 September

13 September

Pool C 
11 September

12 September

13 September

Pool D 
11 September

12 September

13 September

Finals

Draw

Results

Quarter-finals

Semi finals

Final

Final standings

See also 
 World Team Squash Championships

References

External links 
Women's World Team Squash Championships 2018 Official Website

Squash tournaments in China
World Squash Championships
Womens World
W
2018 in women's squash
International sports competitions hosted by China